August Jokinen (11 June 1888 – 3 August 1970) was a Finnish wrestler. He competed in the middleweight event at the 1912 Summer Olympics.

References

External links
 

1888 births
1970 deaths
People from Sysmä
People from Mikkeli Province (Grand Duchy of Finland)
Olympic wrestlers of Finland
Wrestlers at the 1912 Summer Olympics
Finnish male sport wrestlers
Sportspeople from Päijät-Häme